Jürgen Untermann (24 October 1928, in Rheinfelden – 7 February 2013, in Brauweiler) was a German linguist, indoeuropeanist and epigraphist.

A disciple of Hans Krahe and of Ulrich Schmoll, he studied at the University of Frankfurt and the University of Tübingen. He became a professor of Comparative Linguistics at the University of Cologne.

His research focused on the study of the Italic and Palaeohispanic languages, described as "Trümmersprachen" (ruins-languages). He is considered the foremost expert on Palaeohispanic languages (specially the Iberian language), publishing the corpus of Palaeohispanic inscriptions in Monumenta Linguarum Hispanicarum, and systematizing the study of the ancient Iberian names of human beings or anthroponomastics.

On 2010 he was awarded with the Príncipe de Viana Prize for Culture.

Publications
 Die vorgriechischen Sprachen Siziliens. Wiesbaden, 1958
 Die venetischen Personennamen . Wiesbaden, 1961
 Elementos de un atlas antroponímico de la Hispania Antigua. Madrid, 1965
 Monumenta Linguarum Hispanicarum. I. Die Münzlegenden. Wiesbaden, 1975
 Monumenta Linguarum Hispanicarum II: Die Inschriften in iberischer Schrift aus Südfrankreich. Wiesbaden, 1980
 Monumenta Linguarum Hispanicarum III: Die iberischen Inschriften aus Spanien. Wiesbaden, 1990
 Monumenta Linguarum Hispanicarum IV: Die tartessischen, keltiberischen und lusitanischen Inschriften. Wiesbaden, 1997
 Wörterbuch des Oskisch-Umbrischen. Heidelberg, 2000

External links
   List of some publications by Jürgen Untermann

Links to the content of articles by Jürgen Untermann

   "Los etnónimos de la Hispania Antigua y las lenguas prerromnanas de la Península Ibérica" Complutum 2-3, 1992.
   "La onomástica ibérica" Iberia'' nº 4, 1998

Images 

 Jürgen Untermann at his investiture as Doctor Honoris Causa by University of Santiago de Compostela (may the 9th, 2003).

1928 births
2013 deaths
People from Rheinfelden (Baden)
People from the Republic of Baden
Linguists from Germany
Linguists of Indo-European languages
Members of the Institute for Catalan Studies